The rhythmic gymnastics competition at the 2017 World Games took place from July 21 to July 22, in Wrocław in Poland, at the Centennial Hall.

Participating nations

Medal table

Events

References

External links
 The World Games 2017
 Result Book

2017 World Games